is a Japanese actor and voice actor from Chiba Prefecture. He is affiliated with Bungakuza.

Dubbing roles

Television animation
Ben 10 (Carl Tennyson)
Detective Conan (Yoshiyuki Yabūchi)
Jackie Chan Adventures (Valmont, John Smith, Larry Franklin, Dark Hand newcomer)
The Tatami Galaxy (Temporal Lobe)
Teen Titans (Brother Blood)

Theatrical animation
Finding Nemo (Bubbles)
Finding Dory (Bubbles)
Hoodwinked (Detective Bill Stork)
Meet the Robinsons (Uncle Gaston)

Video games
Microsoft Flight Simulator X

Live action
Ad Astra (Captain Lawrence Tanner (Donnie Keshawarz))
Amelia (Fred Noonan (Christopher Eccleston))
Avatar: The Way of Water (Dr. Norm Spellman (Joel David Moore))
Babe (Ferdinand the Duck (Danny Mann))
Bridget Jones's Diary (Interviewer)
Coming to America (1999 Nippon TV edition) (Semmi, Morris, Reverend Brown, Ugly Girl (Arsenio Hall))
Dark Shadows (Roger Collins (Jonny Lee Miller))
The Detonator (Jozef Bostanescu (Tim Dutton))
Doctor Who (Dalek)
En liten julsaga (Ina's father (Thomas Hedengran))
From the Earth to the Moon (Donn F. Eisele (John Mese))
Gambit (Martin Zaidenweber (Stanley Tucci))
Growing Pains (Maurice)
Harry Potter and the Goblet of Fire (Igor Karkaroff (Predrag Bjelac))
Henry Fool (Henry Fool (Thomas Jay Ryan))
Hornblower (Count Edwinton)
Just Mercy (Ralph Myers (Tim Blake Nelson))
Kim Su-ro, The Iron King (Shingwi Gan / Tae-gang (Yu Oh-seong))
Lady in the Water (Cleveland Heep (Paul Giamatti))
Lost (Daniel Faraday (Jeremy Davies))
Lucy (Pierre Del Rio (Amr Waked))
Luther (DCI Ian Reed (Steven Mackintosh))
Matilda (FBI Agent Bob (Paul Reubens))
Medium (Joe DuBois (Jake Weber))
Mindhunters (Vince Sherman (Clifton Collins Jr.))
My Lovely Sam Soon (Doctor Henry Kim (Daniel Henney))
Notting Hill (Spike (Rhys Ifans))
The Omen (Keith Jennings (David Thewlis))
Payback (2001 Nippon TV edition) (Val Resnick (Gregg Henry))
Pirates of the Caribbean: On Stranger Tides (Captain of the Guard (Luke Roberts))
Platoon (1998 DVD edition) (Lieutenant Wolfe (Mark Moses))
Plunkett & Macleane (Lord Rochester (Alan Cumming))
Primeval (Matt Collins (Gideon Emery))
Rabbit Hole (Howie Corbett (Aaron Eckhart))
Roman Holiday (2004 Nippon TV edition) (Mario Delani (Paolo Carlini))
seaQuest DSV (Lieutenant Tim O'Neill (Ted Raimi))
Serendipity (Lars Hammond (John Corbett))
Taking Lives (Christopher Hart (Kiefer Sutherland))
There Will Be Blood (Henry Brands (Kevin J. O'Connor))
Transformers (Mister Hosney (Peter Jacobson))
Underworld: Rise of the Lycans (Andreas Tanis (Steven Mackintosh))
Unsane (David Strine/George Shaw (Joshua Leonard))
The West Wing (Matthew Vincente "Matt" Santos (Jimmy Smits))
The World's End (Steven Prince (Paddy Considine))

References

External links
Official agency profile 

1962 births
Living people
Japanese male video game actors
Japanese male voice actors
Male voice actors from Chiba Prefecture